In re McUlta, 189 F. 250 (M.D. Pa. 1911), is one of several precedent-setting US federal court rulings that clearly defined and established common law name changes as a legal right.

The case stems from Truman Day McCleas moving from New York State to Pennsylvania. In Pennsylvania, he assumed, by common law, at will, the name of "J. D. McUlta", and then went bankrupt after several years of doing business under that name.

The ruling states that even if a court is granted permission to change a name by petition and decree, that permission does "not change the common-law rule that a man may lawfully change his name at will and will be bound by any contract into which he enters under his adopted or reputed name, and that he may sue and be sued in that name". Explicitly, a common law name change carries the same legal weight as a court-decreed name change. The ruling also uses term of art "at will", clarifying that common law allows name changes "at will" and no court-issued order of name change is required.

This case is also precedent that a person's name is irrelevant in regard to the person; rather, it only indicates the person. One may change one's name by common law, but the existence of that person does not change:

References 

United States district court cases
1911 in United States case law
Law articles needing an infobox